Lipocosma is a genus of moths of the family Crambidae.

Species
Lipocosma adelalis (Kearfott, 1903)
Lipocosma albibasalis (Hampson, 1906)
Lipocosma albinibasalis 
Lipocosma antonialis 
Lipocosma ausonialis (Druce, 1899)
Lipocosma calla (Kaye, 1901)
Lipocosma chiralis Schaus, 1920
Lipocosma coroicalis 
Lipocosma diabata 
Lipocosma fonsecai Solis & Adamski, 1998
Lipocosma forsteri 
Lipocosma furvalis (Hampson, 1912)
Lipocosma grimbaldalis 
Lipocosma hebescalis 
Lipocosma intermedialis 
Lipocosma isola 
Lipocosma nigripictalis 
Lipocosma nigrisquamalis Hampson, 1912
Lipocosma parcipunctalis 
Lipocosma pitilia Solis & Adamski, 1998
Lipocosma polingi 
Lipocosma rosalia Solis & Adamski, 1998
Lipocosma sabulalis 
Lipocosma saralis 
Lipocosma septa Munroe, 1972
Lipocosma sicalis Walker, 1859
Lipocosma teutonialis

References

Glaphyriinae
Crambidae genera
Taxa named by Julius Lederer